Lankascincus sameerai, commonly known as Sameera's lanka skink, is a species of lizard in the family Scincidae. The species is endemic to the island of Sri Lanka.

Taxonomy
L. sameerai most closely resembles L. gansi and L. merrill.

Description
The dorsum of L. sameerai is dark blackish brown with dark chestnut brown laterally. The limbs are blackish brown, the hind limbs with pale brown markings. The venter is brownish pink. The throat is dark gray. There are yellow flecks on the upper labials, and white flecks on the lower labials. The neck is dark brown. The snout is short, with a large rostral shield.

Habitat and ecology
L. sameerai was first discovered from submontane forest patches in Morningside, Matara. It is a diurnal skink commonly found under leaf litter on the forest floor.

References

External links
 http://reptile-database.reptarium.cz/species?genus=Lankascincus&species=sameerai

Reptiles of Sri Lanka
Lankascincus
Reptiles described in 2020